Hīt, also spelled Heet, ancient name Is, is an Iraqi city in Al-Anbar province. Hīt lies northwest of Ramadi, the provincial capital.

Straddling the Euphrates River, the city of Hīt was originally a small walled town surrounded by a halt moat and built on two mounds on the site of the ancient city of Is. In ancient times, the town was known for its bitumen wells; bitumen from the wells was used in the construction of Babylon over 3,000 years ago, and for tasks such as caulking boats. Hīt also became a frontier fortress for Assyria. Now, Hīt is a marketplace for agricultural produce. Oil pipelines to the Mediterranean Sea cross the Euphrates there. It was regarded as the head of navigation on the river before the decline in river traffic. Hit marks the beginning of the high sedimentary plain on the Euphrates, and it contains a number of hot springs. The city of Heet is also famous for its ancient yet still functioning water wheels (also known as norias, or al-Nawaeer) which used to play an important role in the irrigation of fields and palm groves, particularly when water levels of the Euphrates River receded. The walled town, which had already suffered extensive damage during the Ottoman Empire, was abandoned in the 1920s, leading to its rapid deterioration.

History 
In ancient times, the area around Hit was very fertile and was used for agriculture. During the Early Dynastic Period the Sumerians discovered bitumen wells in the region, which they used in building the Ziggurats. They also used it in shipbuilding, to waterproof their boats. During the era of the Akkadian Empire, when Sargon of Akkad (2279–2334 BC) unified ancient Iraq by conquering many Sumerian cities, he established a city near modern-day Hit which he called Tutul, meaning "the city of buckets".

This is the first name which is known for this city. Its importance was attested by Sargon himself, who said that the god Dagon gave him the area which comprised Tutul and Mari, capital of the Amorites.  There is also an inscription by Naram-Sin which mentions Tutul, as one of the cities bequeathed to him by Dagon. The Akkadian kings after Naram-Sin were weak, which led to the establishment of a renewed Sumerian kingdom in 2120 BC. This kingdom included Tutul, and lasted until about 1950 BC.

In 1850 BC, the city-state of Eshnunna, which had begun in the Diyala Valley, took control of Tutul. Babylonia achieved preeminence in the area for a time, and was followed by Assyria.  The Assyrian king Tiglath-Pileser I (r. 1114–1076 B.C.) changed the name of Tutul to Eru.  During the era of Aramean expansion in the 11th century BC, they settled in Eru for a time before moving to southern Iraq. When the Neo-Assyrian Empire was established in 911 BC, they reasserted control of Eru.  Cuneiform tablets from the time of Tukulti-Ninurta II (891–884 BC) mention the city and its bitumen wells. During this period the city was known as Atum or Hitum, meaning bitumen.  The modern name Hit comes from Hitum.  Hitum remained part of the Bablyonian-Chaldean empire until its fall in 539 BC.

The Greek historian Herodotus used the name Is for the city, while other Greeks called in Isiopolis.  During the era of the Parthian Empire, it was a waystation on the road to Ctesiphon.  It was sacked multiple times during the Byzantine–Sasanian wars. During Julian's Persian War in 363, the Roman army encamped at Hit and destroyed much of the city. It was rebuilt by Shapur II.

As part of the Muslim conquest of Persia, Hit was conquered by the Arab army in 636. The defenders dug a moat around the city, but the Muslim army was able to penetrate it.  In 639, the Muslim commander Harith ibn Yazid al-'Amri built the city's first mosque, .

Hit prospered during the medieval period. Ibn Hawqal remarked on its large population, and Hamdallah Mustawfi counted over 30 villages as its dependencies. The city produced a great deal of fruit; its noted agricultural products included nuts, dates, oranges, and eggplants. However, the neighboring bitumen springs produced an overpowering stench that made Hit unpleasant to live in.

In October 2014, the city had fallen to the Islamic State of Iraq and the Levant, but was recaptured after a military offensive by the Iraqi Army in April 2016.

Hit is mostly populated by the Al-Sawatra tribe.

Climate
Hīt has a hot desert climate (Köppen climate classification BWh). Most rain falls in the winter. About  of precipitation falls annually.

Gallery

References

Sources
 

Cities in Iraq
District capitals of Iraq
Populated places in Al Anbar Governorate
Populated places on the Euphrates River